Cham-e Qalateh (also Romanized as Cham Qalāteh) is a village in Kakavand-e Gharbi Rural District, Kakavand District, Delfan County, Lorestan Province, Iran. At the 2006 census, its population was 398, in 71 families.

References 

Towns and villages in Delfan County